National Ganga River Basin Authority (NGRBA) is a financing, planning, implementing, monitoring and coordinating authority for the Ganges River, functioning under the Jal Shakti ministry of India.  The mission of the organisation is to safeguard the drainage basin which feeds water into the Ganges by protecting it from pollution or overuse. In July 2014, the NGRBA has been transferred from the Ministry of Environment and Forests to the Ministry of Water Resources, River Development & Ganga Rejuvenation, formerly Ministry of Water Resources (India).

Union government in a notification issued on 20 September 2016 has taken decision under River Ganga (Rejuvenation, Protection and Management) Authorities Order 2016 for a new body named "National Council for River Ganga (Rejuvenation, Protection and Management)" NCRG to replace existing NGRBA. The new body will act as an authority replacing the existing National Ganga River Basin Authority for overall responsibility for superintendence of pollution prevention and rejuvenation of river Ganga Basin.

Establishment
It was established by the Central Government of India, on 20 February 2009 under Section 3(3) of the Environment Protection Act, 1986, which also declared Ganges as the "National River" of India.

Overview
The Prime Minister is the chair of the Authority.  Other members include the cabinet ministers of ministries that include the Ganges among their direct concerns and the chief ministers of states through which the Ganges River flows. The Chief Ministers as members are from the states through which Ganges flow  viz. Uttarakhand, UP, Bihar, Jharkhand, West Bengal, among others.

The first meeting of the National Ganga River Basin Authority was held on 5 October 2009.

In the 2010 Union budget of India, the allocation for National Ganga River Basin Authority doubled to 500 crore (5,000,000,000.00).

Members of the NGRBA
There are total of 23 members of the NGRBA. 14 out of 23 come from the government sectors whereas the remaining 9 come from the NGO sector.

Government members of the Committee
Members belonging to the government sector are as follows:

Prime Minister of India, chair
Minister of Environment and Forests (Union Minister)
Minister of Finance
Minister of Urban Development
Minister of Water Resources
Minister of Power
Minister of Sciences and Technology
Chief Minister of Uttarakhand
Chief Minister of Uttar Pradesh
Chief Minister of Bihar
Chief Minister of Jharkhand
Chief Minister of West Bengal
Ministry of Environment and Forests (state minister)
Ministry of Environment and Forests, secretary

Expert members of the committee 
Members belonging to the NGO sector are as follows:

 Justice(Retd.) Giridhar Malviya, Patron, Ganga Mahasabha, Varanasi.
 Shri Mohan Singh Rawat Gaonwasi, Ex. Minister Uttarakhand.
 Shri M.A. Chitle, Maharashtra.
 Dr. Bhure lal, IAS (Retd.), Delhi
 Shri N.Vittal, Chennai

References

External links
 National Ganga River Basin Authority, website

2009 establishments in Delhi
Ganges
Government agencies of India
Government agencies established in 2009
Environment of India
Organisations based in Delhi
Ecological restoration
Water in India
Ministry of Water Resources (India)
Environmental organisations based in India